Colcu mac Connacan (died 884) was an Irish historian and Abbot of Ceann Eitigh (Kinnitty),

The Annals of the Four Masters, sub anno 884, contains Colcu's obituary:

Colcu, son of Connacan, Abbot of Ceann Eitigh, doctor of eloquence, and the best historian that was in Ireland in his time ... died.

External links
 http://www.ucc.ie/celt/published/T100005A/

9th-century Irish poets
9th-century Irish abbots
People from County Offaly
Irish male poets
884 deaths